The 2012–13 Dynamo Dresden season is the 63rd season in the club's football history. In 2012–13 the club plays in the 2. Fußball-Bundesliga, the second tier of German football. It is the clubs second consecutive season in this league, having played at this level since 2011–12, after winning promotion from the 3. Liga in 2011.

The club also takes part in the 2012–13 edition of the DFB-Pokal, the German Cup, where it reached the second round and will face Bundesliga side Hannover 96 next.

Review and events
Dynamo Dresden was fined €20,000 for a riot in a DFB-Pokal match against Borussia Dortmund the previous season. The club were only permitted sell 13,000 tickets to their own supporters and 3,000 tickets to supporters of 1860 München for their first home game of the season.

Matches

Legend

2. Bundesliga

Relegation play-off

Dynamo Dresden won 2–1 on aggregate to stay in the 2. Bundesliga

DFB-Pokal

Squad

Transfers

Summer

In:

Out:

Winter

In:

Out:

Sources

External links
 2012–13 Dynamo Dresden season at Weltfussball.de 
 2012–13 Dynamo Dresden season at kicker.de 
 2012–13 Dynamo Dresden season at Fussballdaten.de 

Dynamo Dresden
Dynamo Dresden seasons